Whirligig Theatre is a British theatre company based in London.  It presents full-length musicals and plays in London and on tour.
Whirligig was founded in 1979 by David Wood and John Gould. Its first production was the musical, The Plotters of Cabbage Patch Corner at Sadler's Wells Theatre, London.

References

Arts organizations established in 1979
Theatre production companies
Theatre companies in London